Battle of Kolhapur was a battle that took place on 28 December 1659, near the city of Kolhapur, Maharashtra between the Maratha Army, led by Shivaji Maharaj and the Adilshahi forces, led by Rustam Zaman. The battle is known for brilliant movement of flanks by Shivaji Maharaj, similar to tactics of Babur against Rana Sanga.

Background
Shivaji Maharaj had killed Afzal Khan and routed his army in the battle of Pratapgarh on 10 November 1659. He took advantage of this victory and in a great offensive took a large hilly tract running about 200 km under his command. A number of forts like Vasota fell to Marathas. By December 1659, Shivaji Maharaj appeared near Panhala fort. Rustam Zaman was directed from Bijapur. He arrived near Miraj in the vicinity of Kolhapur on 27 December 1659.

Battle

Composition of Adilshah’s forces
Rustam Zaman was assisted by other chieftains: Fazal Khan, Malik Itbar, Sadat Khan, Yakub Khan, Aankush Khan, Hasan Khan, Mulla Yahya and Santaji Ghatage. Adilshah's forces were consisted of selected well known cavalry. In addition, elephants were deployed as first line of defense. The centre was commanded by Rustam Zaman himself, left flank by Fazal Khan, right flank by Malik Itbar. Fateh Khan and Mullah Yahya were on the rear guard. In total Rustam Zaman had an army of 10,000 cavalry.

Composition of Maratha forces
Shivaji Maharaj was assisted by Maratha Cavalry leaders: Netaji Palkar, Sardar Godaji Jagtap, Hiroji Ingale, Bhimaji Wagh, Sidhoji Pawar Jadhavrao, Hanmantrao Kharate, Pandhare, Siddi Hllal, and Mahadik. Center was commanded by Shivaji Maharaj himself. Siddi Hilal and Jadhavrao were on left flank. Ingale and Sidhoji Pawar on right flank. Mahadik and Wagh on the rear guard. Netaji Palkar was off the centre. In all Shivaji Maharaj commanded an army of 3,500 light cavalry much less than his rival Rustam's 10,000 cavalry.

Movement and clash of forces
Rustam Zaman was planning to move towards Panhala fort. Shivaji Maharaj anticipated this movement and in a quick dash, with 3,500 cavalry appeared before the 10,000 strong Adilshahi forces and attacked the enemy in the early morning of 28 December 1659. Shivaji Maharaj charged the center and instructed his generals to outflank the enemy. Other Maratha commanders attacked their respective flanks, resulting in 2,000 of Rustam Zaman force to be killed. With 20% of their army dead, and Shivaji Maharaj pressing hard from the center, Rustam's forces started to crumble and ran away from the battle. By afternoon Rustam Zaman had fled the field.

Outcome
Shivaji Maharaj gained a large territory and secured front of his emerging empire. Adilshahi forces lost about 2000 horses and 12 elephants to the Marathas. The Marathas under Shivaji Maharaj's leadership, continued to conquer more Adilshahi territories. In one of the incidences, Shivaji Maharaj tried to conquer an Adilshahi fort named Khelna but the terrain of the fort was difficult; conquering the fort was easier said than done. The Adilshahi garrison at the fort was also defending the fort valiantly. Therefore, Shivaji Maharaj came up with a plan. Accordingly, a group of Marathas went up to the fort and convinced the Adilshahi chief (killedar) at the fort that they were not content with the rule of Shivaji Maharaj and thus, had come to serve Adilshah. The Marathas were successful and the next day, they revolted and caused total chaos inside the fort. Simultaneously, Shivaji Maharaj attacked the fort from outside and within no time captured the fort. Shivaji Maharaj renamed the fort as Vishalgad.

References

1659 in India
Kolhapur 1659
Kolhapur
Kolhapur
Shivaji